Awaroa may refer to the following in New Zealand:

 Awaroa, the Māori name for Godley Head in Christchurch
 Awaroa River (disambiguation), various rivers